Implicit data collection is used in human–computer interaction to gather data about the user in an implicit, non-invasive way.

Overview

The collection of user-related data in human–computer interaction is used to adapt the computer interface to the end user. The data collected are used to build a user model. The user model is then used to help the application to filter the information for the end user. Such systems are useful in recommender applications, military applications (implicit stress detection) and others.

Channels for collecting data

The system can record the user's explicit interaction and thus build an MPEG7 usage history log. Furthermore, the system can use other channels to gather information about the user's emotional state. The following implicit channels have been used so far to get the affective state of the end user:

 facial activity
 posture activity
 hand tension and activity
 gestural activity
 vocal expression
 language and choice of words
 electrodermal activity
 eye tracking

Emotional spaces

The detected emotional value is usually described any of the two most popular notations:

 a 3D emotional vector: valence, arousal, dominance
 degree of affiliation to the 6 basic emotions (sadness, happiness, anger, fear, disgust, surprise)

External links
 Evaluating affective interactions: Alternatives to asking what users feel Rosalind Picard, Shaundra Bryant Daily

Human–computer interaction